Iniistius naevus, the blemished razorfish, is a species of marine ray-finned fish 
from the family Labridae, the wrasses. It is found in the Eastern Indian Ocean.
  

References

naevus
Taxa named by Gerald R. Allen
Taxa named by Mark van Nydeck Erdmann
Fish described in 2012